Acidofilia is the tenth studio album by Polish thrash metal band Acid Drinkers. It was released on 13 May 2002. The album was mastered at High-End Studio by Grzegorz Piwkowski. It was rereleased in 2008 by Metal Mind with a bonus video for the song "Acidofilia". It is the final album to feature Przemek "Perła" Wejmann.

The album title was created by Dariusz "Maleo" Malejonek (Maleo Reggae Rockers, Izrael, Houk, 2Tm2,3, and Arka Noego). The original album cover featured frontman Titus pregnant, but was quickly changed before the release of the album.

Track listing
All music composed by Acid Drinkers. All lyrics written by Titus, except "Pig to Rent" and "Hydrogen" written by Perła.

Personnel
Acid Drinkers
Tomek "Titus" Pukacki – vocals, bass
Darek "Popcorn" Popowicz – lead guitar
Maciek "Ślimak" Starosta – drums, production, mixing, cover concept
Przemek "Perła" Wejmann – rhythm guitar, production, mixing, cover concept, graphic design

Production
Jacek Chraplak – production, mixing
Grzegorz Piwkowski – mastering
Krzysztof Tokarski – cover concept, graphic design, artwork
Tomasz Mielcarz – photography

References

Acid Drinkers albums
2002 albums